Markeisha Gatling (born July 14, 1992) is an American and Montenegrin professional basketball player for Nadezhda Orenburg of Russian Premier League.

College career
Gatling spent two years at Gulf Coast Community College and then attended North Carolina State University the next two years.

Professional career

WNBA
Gatling was drafted with the 10th overall pick in the 2014 WNBA Draft by the Chicago Sky. Gatling averaged 10.7 points and 2.4 rebounds in 2014, her rookie year with the Sky. Upon the 2015 season, she was waived by the Sky and then signed with the Seattle Storm. During the 2015 season, she averaged a career-high in scoring. In the 2016 season, Gatling was waived by the Storm after 11 games played and the signed with the Atlanta Dream. In February 2017, Gatling re-signed with the Dream to a training camp contract. In May 2017, Gatling was waived by the Dream.

Overseas
On 8 January 2015 she joined Artego Bydgoszcz in the Polish league. In the 2015-16 WNBA off-season, Gatling played in Korea for Incheon Shinhan Bank S-Birds. In August 2016, she signed a short-term deal with Beşiktaş JK of the Turkish League for the 2016-17.  In 2018-2019 she played in France for Basket Landes . In 2019-2020 she played in Italy for Sicily by car . WNBA off-season.

References

External links
NC State profile
Q&A – Swish Appeal

1992 births
Living people
American women's basketball players
Atlanta Dream players
Basketball players from Raleigh, North Carolina
Centers (basketball)
Chicago Sky draft picks
Chicago Sky players
Junior college women's basketball players in the United States
NC State Wolfpack women's basketball players
Seattle Storm players
Montenegrin women's basketball players
Naturalized citizens of Montenegro